Live at the Burton Cummings Theatre is a live album and concert DVD by Canadian indie rock band The Weakerthans. The album was recorded during April 2009 at the Burton Cummings Theatre in the band's home town of Winnipeg, as they toured in support of their album Reunion Tour. It was released March 23, 2010 on ANTI-.

Track listing
 Everything Must Go
 Tournament of Hearts
 Our Retired Explorer (Dines with Michel Foucault in Paris in 1969)
 Night Windows
 Reconstruction Site
 Aside
 Civil Twilight
 Bigfoot
 Plea from a Cat Named Virtute
 The Reasons
 Sun in an Empty Room
 Left and Leaving
 Wellington's Wednesdays
 Benediction
 Manifest
 One Great City!
 This Is a Fire Door Never Leave Open
 Virtute the Cat Explains Her Departure

References

The Weakerthans albums
2010 live albums
2010 video albums